404 may refer to:
 404 (number)
 AD 404
 404 BC
 HTTP 404, the HTTP error response status for "Not Found"

Cars 
 Peugeot 404
 Bristol 404, produced in the 1950s
 Unimog 404

Highways 
 A404(M) motorway, in England
 Ontario Highway 404, in Canada
 Maryland Route 404, in the U.S.
 List of highways numbered 404

Other uses 
 404 Error Not Found (film), a 2011 Hindi film
 404 (band), a band signed to Dirty Hit
 Project 404, a United States military mission to Laos during the Vietnam War
 Alitalia Flight 404, an Alitalia-Linee Aeree Italiane flight that crashed on 14 November 1990 killing all on board
 Martin 4-0-4, an American pressurized passenger airliner built by the Glenn L. Martin Company
 Area code 404, a telephone area in Atlanta
 Section 404 of the 2002 Sarbanes–Oxley Act
 Room 404 – The Wrong Man, the second room in the 1995 film Four Rooms
 "404", a song by Ram Jam from the 1977 album Ram Jam

See also
 The 404 (disambiguation)